Paracholeothrips is a genus of thrips in the family Phlaeothripidae.

Species
 Paracholeothrips calcicolae
 Paracholeothrips clavisetae
 Paracholeothrips gracilis
 Paracholeothrips mulgae
 Paracholeothrips validus

References

Phlaeothripidae
Thrips
Thrips genera